The Irish League representative team was the representative side of the Irish Football League, the national league for football in Northern Ireland from 1922 and, prior to that the league for Ireland.

The Irish League was suspended from 1941–42 to 1946–47 due to the Second World War. As a replacement the Northern Ireland Regional League (aka the North Regional League) was organised and results listed below during this period are therefore for the Northern Ireland Regional League representative team.

From 2007 to 2010 the Irish Premier League was represented by the Northern Ireland Under-23 team in the International Challenge Trophy.

Irish League representative match results

Notes
 * Also billed as Yugoslavian League XI
 ** Also billed as England National Game XI

References

NIFL Premiership
Representative teams of association football leagues
1893 establishments in Ireland
Sports organizations established in 1893